Simon Kiprono Chelugui is a Kenyan politician who is currently Cabinet Secretary for Cooperatives and Micro and Small Enterprise having been appointed by President William Ruto and sworn into office on 27th October 2022.

He was previously Cabinet Secretary for Water, Sanitation & Irrigation during the Presidency of Uhuru Kenyatta. As of September 2022, Simon Chelugui is the only minister who served under former President Uhuru Kenyatta to have been extended by new Head of State William Ruto.

See also
Politics of Kenya

References

Kenyan politicians
Year of birth missing (living people)
Living people
Place of birth missing (living people)